Aki Lahti (22 December 1931 – 1998) was a Finnish chess player, Finnish Chess Championship medalist (1966, 1969).

Biography
From the end of 1950s to the begin 1970s, Aki Lahti was one of Finland's leading chess players. In Finnish Chess Championships he has won silver (1969) and bronze (1966) medals. In 1969, in Raach Aki Lahti participated in World Chess Championship Zonal tournament.

Aki Lahti played for Finland in the Chess Olympiads:
 In 1966, at first reserve board in the 17th Chess Olympiad in Havana (+1, =3, -4),
 In 1970, at first reserve board in the 19th Chess Olympiad in Siegen (+0, =1, -4).

Aki Lahti played for Finland in the World Student Team Chess Championships:
 In 1955, at first board in the 2nd World Student Team Chess Championship in Lyon (+3, =5, -3),
 In 1956, at second board in the 3rd World Student Team Chess Championship in Uppsala (+0, =2, -6).

References

External links

Aki Lahti chess games at 365chess.com

1931 births
1998 deaths
Finnish chess players
Chess Olympiad competitors
20th-century chess players